= Ivorian Revolutionary Party =

Political party

Ivorian Revolutionary Party (French: Parti Revolutionnaire Ivorien) was an Ivorian clandestine opposition group. It existed around 1959.
